Michael Ngadeu-Ngadjui (born 23 November 1990) is a Cameroonian professional footballer who plays as a centre-back for Belgian club Gent and captains the Cameroon national team.

Club career
Ngadeu trained as a youth with Canon Yaoundé. After graduating in Cameroon, he spent six months learning German in order to study Civil Engineering in Germany. Whilst in Germany, he played for SV Sandhausen II and 1. FC Nürnberg II, before transferring to Romanian club Botoșani in 2014, where he eventually wore the captain's armband.

Slavia Prague
Despite rumours linking him with a move to Steaua Bucharest, in the summer of 2016 he completed a €500k transfer to Slavia Prague.

On 9 May 2018, he played as Slavia Prague won the 2017–18 Czech Cup final against Jablonec.

In January 2019, a €4.5 million transfer to Premier League side Fulham fell through at the last minute, after Ngadeu had flown to London and passed a medical.

He again featured heavily in the 2018–19 season, both in Slavia's Europa League campaign that ended in the quarter finals, and domestically, where the team secured their first domestic double since 1942. At the end of the 2018–19 Czech First League season, he was voted the league's best defender.

Gent
In July 2019, Ngadeu moved to Belgian club Gent.

International career
Ngadeu made his senior debut for the Cameroon national team in a 2–0 win over The Gambia for 2017 Africa Cup of Nations qualification. He went on to play every minute of Cameroon's victorious 2017 Africa Cup of Nations campaign, scoring two goals, including a clearance off the line followed by the winning goal in the group stage match against Guinea-Bissau. He was ultimately named one of three defenders in the Confederation of African Football's Team of the Tournament.

Upon his return from the 2017 Africa Cup of Nations, he scored the only hat-trick of his senior career for Slavia Prague in his first game back on 25 February 2017 in their 8–1 away win at Příbram.

In September 2018, he was named as captain for new manager Clarence Seedorf's first 2019 Africa Cup of Nations qualifying game against The Comoros.

Career statistics

Club

International

Scores and results list Cameroon's goal tally first, score column indicates score after each Ngadeu-Ngadjui goal.

Honours
Slavia Prague
 Czech First League: 2016–17, 2018–19
 Czech Cup: 2017–18, 2018–19

Gent
 Belgian Cup: 2021–22

Cameroon
 Africa Cup of Nations: 2017

References

External links
 
 
 
 

1990 births
Living people
People from West Region (Cameroon)
Cameroonian footballers
Association football defenders
Cameroon international footballers
Ngadeu-Ngadjui
2017 Africa Cup of Nations players
2017 FIFA Confederations Cup players
2019 Africa Cup of Nations players
2021 Africa Cup of Nations players
Regionalliga players
Liga I players
Czech First League players
Belgian Pro League players
Canon Yaoundé players
SV Sandhausen players
1. FC Nürnberg II players
FC Botoșani players
SK Slavia Prague players
K.A.A. Gent players
Cameroonian expatriate sportspeople in Germany
Expatriate footballers in Germany
Cameroonian expatriate sportspeople in Romania
Expatriate footballers in Romania
Cameroonian expatriate sportspeople in the Czech Republic
Expatriate footballers in the Czech Republic
Cameroonian expatriate sportspeople in Belgium
Expatriate footballers in Belgium